Dilip Ratha is a scholar of international migration and its relationship with global development. He is known for his role in adding remittances to discussions of migration and development, starting around 2003.

Personal life
Dilip was born in Sindhekela, Balangir, Odisha, India. He ended his school education early, and left his village to pursue higher studies, getting a Ph.D. from the Indian Statistical Institute. He later joined the World Bank and moved to the United States.

Professional life
Ratha heads KNOMAD, a World Bank initiative organizing data and knowledge on migration. He also hosts and blogs at the World Bank People Move blog, heads the Migration and Remittances Unit at the Migrating Out of Poverty Initiative of the Department for International Development of the United Kingdom, and has authored content for the Migration Policy Institute.

Media coverage
Dilip Ratha's professional work and personal journey as a migrant was profiled in The New York Times in 2008. He has also been cited and quoted in The New York Times, The Wall Street Journal The Washington Post, and Forbes.

References

External links
  
 
 Who is Dilip Ratha

Indian development economists
Living people
Year of birth missing (living people)
Scientists from Odisha
20th-century Indian economists